The Bernard 70 was a 1920s design for a French single-seat monoplane fighter aircraft by the Société des Avions Bernard. It was not built but was developed into a racing monoplane designated the Bernard S-72, (later Bernard S-73). It was further developed into single-seat fighters, the Bernard 74-01 and Bernard 74-02, although only two of the fighters were built.

Design and development
The Bernard S-72 was a wooden stressed skin constructed cantilever low-wing monoplane powered by a Gnome-Rhône 5Bc radial engine and had a fixed tailskid landing gear. Flown by Paillard, the Bernard S-72 participated in the 1930 Coupe Michelin race. On 29 June, he took off from Le Bourget, landed successively in Reims, Nancy, Strasbourg, Dijon and Clermont-Ferrand, but unfortunately had to retire near Lyon as a result of engine failure. The S-72 was re-engined with a Gnome-Rhône 7Kb and re-designated the Bernard S-73. The S-73 was then developed into the Bernard 74 single-seat fighter and retained the Titan-Major engine. Two prototypes were built with the first flying in February 1931, powered by a 280 hp (kw) Gnome-Rhône 7Kbs radial engine, the second was fitted with a  Gnome-Rhône 7Kd engine and first flew in October 1931. The first prototype 74 was re-engined with a Gnome-Rhône 9Kbrs radial engine and re-designated the Bernard 75 it was later used as a pilot-trainer. No further aircraft were built.

Variants

Bernard 70
Unbuilt design for a single-seat fighter.
Bernard S-72
Single-seater racing monoplane powered by a  Gnome-Rhône 5Bc radial engine, first flight in May 1930  Later converted to the Bernard S-73.
Bernard S-73
The Bernard 72 re-engined with a  Gnome-Rhône 7Kb radial engine, first flown in May 1930.
Bernard 74-01
Single-seat fighter variant, powered by a  Gnome-Rhône 7Kbs radial engine, later converted to the Bernard 75.
Bernard 74-02
A second prototype powered by a  Gnome-Rhône 7Kd, first flown on 21 October 1931
Bernard 75
Prototype Bernard 74-01 fighter re-engined with a  Gnome-Rhône 9Kbrs radial engine and later used as a pilot-trainer.

Specifications (Bernard 74.01)

References

Notes

Bibliography

External links

 Bernard S-72
 Bernard S-73
 Bernard 74-01
 Bernard 74-02
 Bernard 75

Bernard 070
Bernard 070
070
Aerobatic aircraft
Single-engined tractor aircraft
Aircraft first flown in 1930